= Treaty of Friendship, Commerce and Navigation between Austria-Hungary and Japan =

The Treaty of Friendship, Commerce and Navigation between Austria-Hungary and Japan was signed in Tokyo on October 18, 1869.
